The Hippos were an American rock band formed in 1995 in Los Angeles, California, and disbanded in 2002. The band released three full-length albums. Their early work is best classified as part of the third wave of ska music, or as ska-punk, though in the later years of their career the band transitioned to a more synthesizer-driven power pop and rock sound.

Band history

Formation
The Hippos formed in Los Angeles, California in 1995 with a lineup of Ariel Rechtshaid on vocals and guitar, James Bairian on bass, Louis Castle on trumpet, Danny Rukasin on trombones, Roman Flyscher on saxophone, James' older brother Brandon Bairian on auxiliary percussion, and Kyle Briggs on drums.  They self-released two cassette demos entitled Spreading the Cheese and Attack of the Killer Cheese and began playing shows around southern California, establishing themselves among a prolific ska scene including bands such as Reel Big Fish, No Doubt, Buck-O-Nine, Dance Hall Crashers, Save Ferris, and The Aquabats.

Forget the World
By 1996, the band added Rich Zahniser, formerly of The Goodwin Club, on trombone and had attracted the attention of Fueled by Ramen Records and Stiff Dog Records and entered the studio with producer Loren Israel to record their first album, Forget the World.  Jointly released February 1997 through Fueled by Ramen and Stiff Dog Records, the album was essentially a traditional ska punk effort focusing on upbeat tempos and heavy brass instrumentation. It afforded the band their first national tours at a time when ska and punk rock were gaining national attention.  The band toured on and off in support of Forget the World for over a year. In 1998, the band's relationship with Stiff Dog Records ended and the record was re-pressed, this time by Vagrant Records. Around this time saxophone player Roman Fleysher and auxiliary percussion player Brandon Bairian both left the band, with Roman going on to join The Mighty Mighty Bosstones. A track from the album, Irie, was used on the soundtrack of the movie The Extreme Adventures of Super Dave, which was released straight to video in January 2000.

Heads Are Gonna Roll
By 1999 the band had signed to major label Interscope Records and released their second album, Heads Are Gonna Roll. Musically the album found the band transitioning to a more power pop sound, using fewer ska rhythms and instead incorporating synthesizers. It was their most successful album and their only major-label release. The song "Wasting My Life" received airplay on some radio stations and had a music video directed by The Malloys The_Malloys. The band toured the United States and Australia in support of the album, including stints on the Warped Tour during 1999 and 2000.

Final Days and Beyond
In 2000, during tours in support of Heads Are Gonna Roll, drummer Kyle Briggs left the group. Over the next few years the band rehearsed and recorded new songs with Nate Morton and other drummers, expanding their use of keyboards, synthesizers, and programming. However, the members drifted into other projects and it became apparent that the band would not continue on together. They quietly disbanded, but released a posthumous self-titled album in 2003 through Olympic Records. The product of several months of recording demos in 2000, the album completed their transition from traditional ska punk to synth-driven power pop. 

Following the band's breakup the members moved on to other musical projects. Louis Castle and James Bairian formed the now defunct band Dirty Little Secret, and co-founded and operate a commercial music house called Headquarters Music.  They have done film scoring, starting with the DTV title Connor's War in 2006, which was directed by Castle's father Nick Castle. As The Gifted, the duo handle music production and composition, and scored Southbound, a 2015 Horror anthology film. They have also scored or contributed music to XX, Body at Brighton Rock, and Ready or Not. 

Ariel Rechtshaid played in Dirty Little Secret for a brief period before joining the group Foreign Born, but more recently has focused exclusively on music production and songwriting work, working with artists such as Haim, Vampire Weekend, Taking Back Sunday, We Are Scientists, Plain White Tees, Cass McCombs, Snoop Dogg, and many more. In addition to being nominated for Producer of the Year Grammy at the 2014 Grammy Awards, two albums featuring his production work have won Grammy awards: Modern Vampires of the City by Vampire Weekend won Best Alternative Music Album at the 2014 Grammy Awards and 25 by Adele won Album of the Year at the 2017 Grammy Awards. 

Rich Zahniser formed the now defunct band Southbase, performed as a touring member with several bands, and is active in music production and composition as one half of The Trust.

Danny Rukasin became a band manager for developing artists Hellogoodbye, Man Overboard, For The Foxes, and more for Working Group Artist Management.

Saxophone player Roman Fleysher went on to join The Mighty Mighty Bosstones in 1998 and still occasionally plays with them.

Kyle Briggs went on to form the band Tripod, in which he played from 2000 to 2003. In 2006 he relocated to Portland, Oregon where he released a solo album under the name Long Distance Runner and joined the bands Junkface and Pine. He has also acted as editor, sound mixer, producer, and composer as well.

Nate Morton, who drummed on some tracks on the Hippos (2003) and toured with the band in the US after the departure of Briggs, is now the drummer of the house band of The Voice, among many other accomplishments. 

Garrett Ray, another of three drummers on The Hippos (2003), was the original drummer of Dirty Little Secret and Foreign Born, and is currently a frequent collaborator with Rechtshaid on the records he produces. 

Blair Sinta, the final of the three drummers on The Hippos (2003) and the touring drummer for their final Australian tour, has toured with Josh Grobin, Alanis Morissette, Annie Lennox, and Stevie Nicks among many others, and now runs a home drum tracking business.

Members

Final lineup
 Ariel Rechtshaid – lead vocals, guitar, keyboards (1995–2002)
 James Bairian – bass, backing vocals (1995–2002)
 Blair Sinta – drums (2000–2002); drums on The Hippos
 Louis Castle – trumpet, keyboards, backing vocals (1995–2002)
 Danny Rukasin – trombone (1995–2002)
 Rich Zahniser – trombone, keyboards, backing vocals (1996–2002)

Previous members
 Roman Flyscher – saxophone (1995-1997)
 Brandon Bairian – percussion (1995-1997)
 Kyle Briggs – drums (1995–2000)
 Nate Morton – drums (2000); drums on The Hippos
 Garrett Ray – drums (2000); drums on The Hippos

Timeline

Discography

Albums

Singles

Non-album tracks

Demos

References

External links

Musical groups established in 1995
American ska musical groups
Musical groups from Los Angeles